Rogozhin is a rural locality (a khutor) in Mikhaylovka Urban Okrug, Volgograd Oblast, Russia. The population was 417 as of 2010. There are 15 streets.

Geography 
Rogozhin is located 25 km northwest of Mikhaylovka. Troitsky is the nearest rural locality.

References 

Rural localities in Mikhaylovka urban okrug